The Overton window is the range of policies politically acceptable to the mainstream population at a given time.  It is also known as the window of discourse.

Background
The term is named after American policy analyst Joseph Overton, who stated that an idea's political viability depends mainly on whether it falls within this range, rather than on politicians' individual preferences. According to Overton, the window frames the range of policies that a politician can recommend without appearing too extreme to gain or keep public office given the climate of public opinion at that time.

Summary
Overton described a spectrum from "more free" to "less free" with regard to government intervention, oriented vertically on an axis, to avoid comparison with the left/right political spectrum. As the spectrum moves or expands, an idea at a given location may become more or less politically acceptable. After Overton's death, his Mackinac Center for Public Policy colleague Joseph Lehman further developed the idea and named it after Overton.

Political commentator Joshua Treviño has postulated that the six degrees of acceptance of public ideas are roughly:
 Unthinkable
 Radical
 Acceptable
 Sensible
 Popular
 Policy

The Overton window is an approach to identifying the ideas that define the spectrum of acceptability of governmental policies. It says politicians can act only within the acceptable range. Shifting the Overton window involves proponents of policies outside the window persuading the public to expand the window. Proponents of current policies, or similar ones within the window, seek to convince people that policies outside it should be deemed unacceptable. According to Lehman, who coined the term, "The most common misconception is that lawmakers themselves are in the business of shifting the Overton window. That is absolutely false. Lawmakers are actually in the business of detecting where the window is, and then moving to be in accordance with it."

According to Lehman, the concept is just a description of how ideas work, not advocacy of extreme policy proposals. In an interview with The New York Times, he said, "It just explains how ideas come in and out of fashion, the same way that gravity explains why something falls to the earth. I can use gravity to drop an anvil on your head, but that would be wrong. I could also use gravity to throw you a life preserver; that would be good."

See also
 Comfort zone
 Creeping normality
 Hallin's spheres
 Moral relativism
 Opinion corridor

References

Further reading
 
 
 

Crowd psychology
Eponyms
Policy
Political concepts
Political realism
Political spectrum
Public opinion